Selva di Progno (Cimbrian: Brunghe) is a comune (municipality) in the Province of Verona in the Italian region Veneto, located about  west of Venice and about  northeast of Verona.

Selva di Progno borders the following municipalities: Ala, Badia Calavena, Bosco Chiesanuova, Crespadoro, Recoaro Terme, Roverè Veronese, Velo Veronese, and Vestenanova.

References

External links
 www.baldolessinia.it/selva/

Cities and towns in Veneto